Dame Alicia Markova DBE (1 December 1910 – 2 December 2004) was a British ballerina and a choreographer, director and teacher of classical ballet. Most noted for her career with Sergei Diaghilev's Ballets Russes and touring internationally, she was widely considered to be one of the greatest classical ballet dancers of the twentieth century. She was the first British dancer to become the principal dancer of a ballet company and, with Dame Margot Fonteyn, is one of only two English dancers to be recognised as a prima ballerina assoluta. Markova was a founder dancer of the Rambert Dance Company, The Royal Ballet and American Ballet Theatre, and was co-founder and director of the English National Ballet.

Early years
Markova was born as Lilian Alicia Marks on 1 December 1910. Her father, Arthur, was Jewish by birth; her mother, Eileen (nee Barry), converted to Judaism.

The family lived in a two bedroom flat in Finsbury Park.

Career
Markova began to dance on medical advice to strengthen her weak limbs. She made her stage debut at age ten, performing the role of Salome in the pantomime Dick Whittington and His Cat, for which she was billed as Little Alicia, the child Pavlova. She began studying ballet with Princess Serafina Astafieva, a Russian ballerina living in London. Astafieva was a retired dancer of the Ballets Russes, a renowned ballet company founded by the impresario Sergei Diaghilev. Astafieva established the Russian Dancing Academy at The Pheasantry, King's Road, Chelsea, and was responsible for teaching a number of notable British dancers including Margot Fonteyn and Anton Dolin. A blue plaque now marks the site of her former studio.

Diaghilev's Ballets Russes
At the age of 13, Markova was observed in class by Diaghilev, who was visiting London in search of new talent for his ballet company. He invited her to join the Ballets Russes in Monte Carlo, which she did in 1925, one month after her 14th birthday. Due to her age, she performed a number of roles which were specially choreographed for her, also performing in a varied repertoire of new and established ballets. Alongside the many notable dancers, during this period she encountered a number of leading 20th century figures who created work for the company including Pablo Picasso, Henri Matisse, Igor Stravinsky, Sergei Prokofiev, Léonide Massine, George Balanchine, and Bronislava Nijinska.

After Diaghilev
Following the death of Diaghilev in 1929, Markova returned to England, where she became the founder Principal Ballerina of The Ballet Club, a company founded by Dame Marie Rambert. During this period, she was particularly noted for performing works by Frederick Ashton, who was unknown at the time, but would go on to become one of Britain's most celebrated choreographers. The Ballet Club was to be the first professional ballet company in the United Kingdom, later becoming known as the Ballet Rambert. Now known as the Rambert Dance Company, it remains the oldest established dance company in the UK.

In 1931, Ninette de Valois founded the Vic-Wells Ballet in premises at Sadler's Wells theatre in London. A former colleague from Diaghilev's company, she invited Markova to join the company as one of its founder dancers, which she did, forming a famous partnership with Anton Dolin. De Valois hired Frederick Ashton, who became the resident choreographer and later Artistic Director of the company. In 1933, de Valois appointed Markova as the first Prima Ballerina of the company, which is now the internationally renowned Royal Ballet.

It was after seeing the Camargo Society performance of Giselle with Olga Spessivtseva and Dolin in 1932 that Markova first realized the possibilities of the then-neglected ballet. In time it became her most treasured role and the one whose expressive possibilities she continued to develop throughout her career. Her premiere in the role was on New Year's Day 1934 at the Vic.

In 1935, Markova and Dolin left the Vic-Wells ballet to form their own touring company known as the Markova-Dolin Company. The company toured extensively for two seasons and in 1936 Prince Wolkonsky joined the company as ballet master.  Later in 1938 Markova joined the Ballet Russe de Monte Carlo, touring the world as the company's star ballerina. The company was the first to tour ballet throughout the United States, taking the art form to audiences who had never seen ballet before. During this time, she was a key figure in the formation of the American Ballet Theatre, dancing with the company during its early years.

Markova appeared in ballets around the world, but is remembered mostly for her Giselle, as well as for The Dying Swan and Les Sylphides. During the Second World War she re-formed Les Ballets Russes in the United States and appeared as a dancer with Dolin in the Hollywood film, A Song for Miss Julie.

English National Ballet
In 1950, Markova and Dolin became the co-founders of the Festival Ballet, a company formed to celebrate the imminent Festival of Britain and backed by the Polish businessman Julian Brunsweg. Dolin was to be the company's first Artistic Director, with Markova as Prima Ballerina. The company was formed to tour ballets to audiences that would otherwise be unable to experience ballet, and went on to tour extensively to less conventional venues both in the United Kingdom and internationally. It also established a number of educational programmes designed to make ballet accessible to new audiences. She remained the Prima ballerina until 1952, after which she continued to appear regularly as a guest dancer until her retirement from professional dancing.

In 1960, she collaborated with Indian classical dancer Ram Gopal to create a duet "Radha-Krishna" based on Hindu mythology, in which she danced as Radha, while he danced as Krishna. Today their collaboration is commemorated at the National Portrait Gallery, London where her bronze bust stands next to his portrait. In 1989, the Festival Ballet was renamed English National Ballet to reflect the company's role as Britain's only classical ballet company dedicated to touring ballets nationwide at an affordable price for audiences.

Retirement

Markova retired from professional dancing in January 1963 at the age of 52. Following her retirement, she continued to play an active role in the ballet and theatre industry as a teacher, director and choreographer. She was responsible for staging a number of ballets that she had performed with the Ballets Russes, also coaching dancers for roles she had created for choreographers such as Sir Frederick Ashton.

As a teacher she presented televised master classes and was also appointed Professor of Ballet and Performing Arts at the University of Cincinnati. In her later years, she continued to be a regular member of the teaching faculty for residential ballet courses such as the Yorkshire Ballet Seminars and the Abingdon Ballet Seminars, and was also President and a regular guest teacher at the Arts Educational Schools in London and Tring. She was also a governor and regular guest teacher at the Royal Ballet School.

She was the subject of This Is Your Life on two occasions, in January 1960 when she was surprised by Eamonn Andrews at the Royal Festival Hall, and in October 1995, when Michael Aspel surprised her at London's Royal Opera House. Markova was Patron/President of numerous dance organisations, including serving as President of English National Ballet, a Governor of The Royal Ballet and vice President of the Royal Academy of Dance.

Death
Some time after suffering a stroke, Markova died on 2 December 2004 in a hospital in Bath, one day after her 94th birthday. She never married. A funeral service was held at Bath's Haycombe Crematorium. A memorial service of thanksgiving for her life and work was held at Westminster Abbey on 8 March 2005.

As part of the service, dancers of the English National Ballet company performed extracts from the ballet Giselle (Daria Klimentová, Dmitri Gruzdyev, Erina Takahashi, Arionel Vargas) and Les Sylphides (Agnes Oakes and Simone Clarke).

Awards, titles and honours
1957 - Dance Magazine Award
1957 - Woman of the Year Award (American Women's Organisation)
1958 - CBE, Commander of the Order of the British Empire
1963 - DBE, Dame Commander of Order of the British Empire
1963 - Queen Elizabeth II Coronation Award, Royal Academy of Dance
1966 - DMus, Honorary Doctorate of Music, Leicester University
1982 - MusD, Honorary Doctorate of Music, University of East Anglia
1994 - Evening Standard Special Award
2000 - Cecchetti D'Argento Award, Imperial Society of Teachers of Dancing
2001 - DUniv, Honorary Doctor of the University, Middlesex University

Positions

Co-Founder and President, English National Ballet
Governor, The Royal Ballet
Vice President, Royal Academy of Dance
President, The London Ballet Circle
Patron, The Academy of Indian Dance
President, All England Dance Association
President, The Arts Educational Schools
President, British Ballet Organization

Professor of Ballet and Performing Arts, College-Conservatory of Music, University of Cincinnati
Patron, Friends of Northern Ballet Theatre
Patron, Abingdon Ballet Seminars
Honorary President, ANCEC (Associazione Nationale Coreutica Enrico Cecchetti)
Patron, Critics' Circle National Dance Awards
Director, Metropolitan Opera Ballet 1963–69

See also
List of British Jews
Alicia Markova "The Dying Swan"
Women in dance

References
Notes

Bibliography
"Alicia Markova" by Hugh Fisher
"Markova: a collection of photographic studies by Gordon Anthony"; foreword by Dame Ninette de Valois
"Markova: her life and art", by Sir Anton Dolin, 1953

External links

Andros on Ballet profile of  Alicia Markova, michaelminn.net; accessed 17 May 2014
London Ballet Circle website; accessed 17 May 2014

Profile, English National Ballet website; accessed 17 May 2014
Obituary: Dame Alicia Markova Brilliant prima ballerina, Yorkshire Post, 4 December 2004

1910 births
2004 deaths
English Jews
Jewish dancers
English National Ballet
Ballets Russes dancers
Dancers of The Royal Ballet
Ballet Russe de Monte Carlo dancers
English ballerinas
Dames Commander of the Order of the British Empire
Prima ballerina assolutas
Rambert Dance Company dancers
20th-century ballet dancers